Najm ad-Dīn Abū Ḥafṣ 'Umar ibn Muḥammad an-Nasafī (‎; 1067–1142) was a Muslim jurist, theologian, mufassir, muhaddith and historian. A Persian scholar born in present-day Uzbekistan, he wrote mostly in Arabic.

Works 
He authored around 100 books in Hanafi jurisprudence, theology, Quran exegesis, Hadith and history.

Theology

 Al-'Aqa'id al-Nasafiyya or Aqa'id al-Nasafi is his most celebrated work in Kalam, which alongside Al-Fiqh Al-Akbar of Abu Hanifa and Al-'Aqeedah al-Tahawiyya of Abu Ja'far al-Tahawi is one of the three seminal works in Sunni Islamic creed. By the 17th-century, more than fifty commentaries were written on this work, of which the most famous is al-Taftazani's commentary named Sharh 'Aqaid al-Nasafi. 

Abu Hafs an-Nasafi wrote the Al-'Aqaid as a direct summary of Al-Tamhid le Qawa'id al-Tawhid, the famous book by his own teacher Abu al-Mu'in al-Nasafi.

While a few Arabic sources are sceptical about attributing this work to Abu Hafs an-Nasafi, a recently discovered manuscript of the Persian version of the work confirms the authorship of the work for Abu Hafs al-Nasafi. The Persian version of the work, titled Bayan-e Itiqad-e Ahl-e Sunnat wa Jama'at''', is reported on the authority of Al-Nasafi's most famous student, Burhan al-Din al-Marghinani, the author of Al-Hidayah. Al-Marghinani explains in the preface of the treatise that Abu Hafs a-Nasafi wrote this work in response to a request made by Ahmad Sanjar, the Seljuk ruler and Sultan, when he visited Samarqand in 535 AH or 1140 CE.

Al-Marghinani explains that one of Sultan Sanjar's governors who was the governor of Sistan and was accompanying the Sultan, asked the scholars of Samarqand to write a treatise on the creed of Ahl al-Sunnah so that "no one in Sistan could speak against it". Presumably, Sistan was dominated by the Karramiyya sect who were advocating for anthropomorphism. In response to this request, the scholars of Samarqand asked Abu Hafs al-Nasafi to write the treatise, and they all put their signatures at the end of the document. Among the scholars present at the gathering with Sultan Sanjar was Shaikh al-Islam Abd al-Hameed al-Ismandi al-Samarqandi (the author of the published book titled Tariqah al-Khilaf fi al-Fiqh). Al-Marghinani writes in the preface of the manuscript that he took a copy of the treatise and showed it again to An-Nasafi for a final review.

Quranic sciences
 Al-Taysir fi al-Tafsir is his most celebrated work in tafsir, which was  published in 15 volumes by Darul Lubab in 2019. The work has been widely cited in other leading tafsir works of the Ottoman period, including in Tafsir Ibn Kamal Pasha of Ibn Kemal, Roh al-Bayan of Ismail Haqqi, and Ruh al-Ma'ani of Mahmud al-Alusi. Among the Persian tafsirs, Kamal al-Din Hussain Wa'ez Kashefi extensively cites Al-Taysir in both of his tafsir works, i.e. Jawaher al-Tafsir and Mawaheb-e 'Aliyya.

 Tafsir-e Nasafi is a Persian translation of the Quran in rhymed prose. It is considered to be the third oldest full translation of the Quran in the Persian language, and the only translation of Quran in rhymed prose.

 Al-Akmal al-Atwal fi Tafsir al-Quran was a voluminous work in tafsir, written prior to Al-Taysir fi al-Tafsir. 

 Risalah fi al-Khata' fi Qira'at al-Qur'an or Zillah al-Qari, was published in 2017 by Dar 'Amar.

Jurisprudence
 Manzumah fi al-Khilafyat is a book in the form of poetry, consisting of 2669 verses, explaining the differences in the views of Abu Hanifa and his students, namely Abu Yusuf, Muhammad al-Shaybani and Zufur, on legal rules, as well as the differences between Abu Hanifa and Al-Shafii and Malik ibn Anas. The book was published in 2010 in Beirut.
Over ten commentaries have been written on this work, the most celebrated one being that of Abu al-Barakat al-Nasafi titled Al-Muasaffa, published in 2020 by Dar al-Noor.

 Hasr al-Masa'il wa Qasr al-Dala'il is a commentary on Manzumah fi al-Khilafyat with a detailed exposition of the reasons (adillah) for each legal rule. The book was published by Dar al-Fajr in 2020.

 Tilbah al-Talabah fi al-Istilahat al-Fiqhiyya is a textbook used over centuries in Hanafi schools and has been published multiple times in recent years.

 Manzumah al-Jame' al-Saghir in which Al-Nasafi turned Muhammad Shaibani's seminal work (Al-Jame' Al-Saghir) into poetry consisting of 81 verses.

 Sharh Madar al-Usul is a commentary on Al-Karkhi's seminal work in Usul al-Fiqh.

Biographical history
 Al-Qand fi Zikr 'Ulama'e Samarqand is a biographical encyclopedia of Transoxiana's Islamic scholars.

 Teachers 
He studied under prominent scholars such as Fakhr al-Islam al-Bazdawi, Abu al-Yusr al-Bazdawi, and Abu al-Mu'in al-Nasafi.

 Students 
Burhan al-Din al-Marghinani, the author of Al-Hidayah'', was his most famous student.

See also 
 List of Ash'aris and Maturidis

References

External links
Al-Nasafi, Encyclopaedia of Islam, Second Edition
Tafsir-e Nasafi, partial text of his tafsir in Persian

Hanafis
Maturidis
Hadith scholars
Transoxanian Islamic scholars
Iranian scholars
Persian Sunni Muslim scholars of Islam
12th-century Muslim scholars of Islam
1067 births
1142 deaths
12th-century jurists
People from Qashqadaryo Region
Shaykh al-Islāms